Tom & Jerry is a compilation album by Simon & Garfunkel released in 2002. This album contains songs in their early career, when they were known as Tom & Jerry.

Track listing

"Dream Alone"
"Beat Love"
"Beat Love" (With Harmony)
"Just a Boy"
"Play Me a Sad Song"
"It Means a Lot to Them"
"Flame"
"Shy"
"The Lone Teen Ranger"
"Hey Schoolgirl"
"Our Song"
"That's My Story"
"Teenage Fool"
"Tia-Juana Blues"
"Dancin' Wild"
"Don't Say Goodbye"
"Two Teenagers"
"True or False"
"Simon Says"

Personnel

Séamus Egan - Liner notes
Paul Simon - Vocals, Guitar
Art Garfunkel - Vocals

References

2002 compilation albums
Simon & Garfunkel compilation albums